Q4OS is a light-weight Linux distribution, based on Debian, targeted as a replacement for operating systems that are no longer supported on outdated hardware. The distribution is known for being similar in appearance to Microsoft Windows operating systems with some of its pre-installed themes inspired by the look and feel of Windows 2000 and Windows XP.

History 
Development of Q4OS began in 2014 to coincide with Windows XP's end of extended support in the same year.

LXQt Desktop Environment was included from April 2014 to June 2015.

In 2018 TDE (Trinity Desktop Environment) was included.

In 2019, version 3.8 was released which was based on Debian Buster.

The original KDE based version has been discontinued since around 2018.

As of April 2020, the core developers of Q4OS, initially starting the project in Germany, are now operating in Prague, Czech Republic.

Features 
It comes with either the Trinity Desktop Environment, which is a fork of K Desktop Environment 3. or KDE Plasma 5

LookSwitcher, which lets the user switch visual themes

Desktop Profiler, which automatically installs some packages and programs that may be ideal for the user according to the profile that they choose

Q4OS Software Centre, which lets the user install some recommended packages and programs from a list

Q4OS Welcome Screen, which helps the user with some initial tweaks

Releases 
Stable versions of Q4OS are derived from Debian's Stable release branch with long-term support that lasts five years after their initial release. Developmental "testing" versions of future releases are derived from the Debian Testing branch.

Reception 
SourceForge featured Q4OS as "Community Choice" Project of the Month in April 2020.

In January 2022, TechRadar considered Q4OS as one of the best light-weight Linux distributions of the year for its Windows installer and support for older hardware, notably systems running on 32-bit processors.

Forks 
The Linux distribution Quark is Q4OS with Ubuntu as the base instead of Debian.

See also 
 Comparison of light-weight Linux distributions
 Trinity Desktop Environment
 ReactOS
 Linux XP

References

External links 
 
 
 Q4OS and TDE: A Juicy Little Linux Secret

IA-32 Linux distributions
X86-64 Linux distributions
Linux distributions
Debian-based distributions